Dongodu: Meesam Melesaada Anthe..! is a 2003 Indian Telugu-language romantic comedy  film directed by  Bhimaneni Srinivasa Rao. The film features Ravi Teja and Kalyani in the lead roles. The music has been composed Vidyasagar. The movie released on 7 August 2003 was a decent success at the box office. This is a remake of the Malayalam film Meesa Madhavan (2002).

Plot 
The movie story deals with Madhava who becomes a thief in his childhood to feed the hunger of his sister and he continues to be a notorious thief in that village. There is one landlord called Naidu (Tanikella Bharani) who exploits the people around by unfair means. Rukhmini is the daughter of Naidu. Naidu also possesses the registration forms of Madhava's house with him because he gave loan to the father of Madhava at a very high interest rate. Madhava pretends to fall in love with Rukhmini so that he could get the registration forms of his house back. The Rest of the film is about how Naidu cooks a plan to convict Madhava in a theft which he has not done and how Madhava emerges as winner.

Cast

Soundtrack 

The soundtrack is composed by Vidyasagar. Lyrics are written by Sirivennela Sitaramasastri, Chandrabose, Bashasree and Bandaru Daanayya.
All songs are re-used from the Malayalam original, Meesha Madhavan except for "Meesala Gopala" which was re-used from "Panchangam Paarkathe" in Thavasi and "Dum Dum Dum" from "Radhai Manadhil" in Snegithiye.

Release 
The Hindu gave a mixed review. Idlebrain opined that "One fails to understand why Bheemineni has to buy the remake rights of such an out-of-place storyline and make it in Telugu".

References

External links 
 

2003 films
2000s Telugu-language films
Telugu remakes of Malayalam films
Films scored by Vidyasagar
Films about landlords
Films directed by Bhimaneni Srinivasa Rao